K. Manivarma is an Indian politician and was a Member of the Legislative Assembly of Tamil Nadu. He was elected to the Tamil Nadu legislative assembly as a Tamil Maanila Congress (TMC) candidate from Thandarambattu constituency in the 1996 election.

In 2015, it was announced that Manivarma was taking the office of TMC district president.

References 

Living people
Tamil Nadu MLAs 1996–2001
Tamil Maanila Congress politicians
Year of birth missing (living people)
Tamil Nadu politicians